Her Highness Dances the Waltz (German: Hoheit tanzt Walzer) is a 1935 musical comedy film directed by Max Neufeld and starring Irén Ágay, André Mattoni and Hans Homma. The operetta film is based on the 1912 operetta Hoheit tanzt Walzer by Leo Ascher (music) and Alfred Grünwald (libretto). It was made as an at the Barrandov Studios in Prague. It is one of the few Czech productions that was not made in Czech. The film's sets were designed by the art director Artur Berger. A French version Valse éternelle was released in 1936.

Cast
 Irén Ágay as Princess Marika
 André Mattoni as Prince Georg
 Hans Homma as Fürst Franz von Hohenau
 Anna Kallina as Agnes, Fürst Hohenau's wife
 Phillis Fehr as Liesl, Fürst Hohenaus' daughter
 Maria Balcerkiewiczówna as Countess Lubowska
 Teddy Bill
 Sylvia de Bettini
 Alexander Fischer-Marich as Hofer, music copyist
 Hans Jaray as Josef Langer, composer
 Eugen Neufeld
 Camilla Spira

See also
Her Highness Dances the Waltz (1926)

References

Bibliography
 Dassanowsky, Robert von. World Film Locations: Vienna. Intellect Books, 2012.

External links

1935 films
1935 musical comedy films
Czech musical comedy films
1930s German-language films
Films directed by Max Neufeld
Operetta films
Films based on operettas
Films shot at Barrandov Studios
Czechoslovak black-and-white films